Marius Copil and Victor Crivoi were the defending champions but Copil decided not to participate.
Crivoi played alongside Patrick Ciorcilă, but lost to Jamie Delgado and Jordan Kerr in the first round. 

Oleksandr Nedovyesov and Jaroslav Pospíšil defeated Teodor-Dacian Crăciun and Petru-Alexandru Luncanu in the finals 6–3, 6–1.

Seeds

  Jamie Delgado /  Jordan Kerr (quarterfinals)
  Oleksandr Nedovyesov /  Jaroslav Pospíšil (champions)
  Ruben Gonzales /  Darren Walsh (semifinals)
  Theodoros Angelinos /  Hans Podlipnik-Castillo (first round)

Draw

Draw

References
 Main Draw

BRD Brasov Challenger - Doubles
2013 Doubles